Mohammad Ibrahim Khan (20 December 1911 – 19 February 1977) was an Indian cricketer. He played 25 first-class matches for Hyderabad between 1935 and 1955.

See also
 List of Hyderabad cricketers

References

External links
 

1911 births
1977 deaths
Indian cricketers
Hyderabad cricketers
People from Alwar